Route 257 is a north–south highway on the south shore of the St. Lawrence River, in the Eastern Townships region of Quebec, Canada. Its northern terminus is in Saint-Adrien at a junction with Route 216, and its southern terminus is at the Pittsburg–Chartierville Border Crossing, where it becomes U.S. Route 3 as it enters Pittsburg, New Hampshire.

Towns along Route 257

 Saint-Adrien
 Ham-Sud
 Weedon
 Lingwick
 Scotstown
 La Patrie
 Chartierville

See also
 List of Quebec provincial highways

References

External links 
 
 Route 257 on Google Maps
 Provincial Route Map (Courtesy of the Quebec Ministry of Transportation) 

257